Hong Cheong (also Hung Chiong and Hung Chong) was a Chinese photographer who operated a photographic studio in Yokohama, Japan between 1875 and 1885. In addition to his photographic work he was an artist, chart copier, portrait painter, and dealer in picture frames. Cheong left Japan in 1885 and opened a studio in Hong Kong. His photographic works included large format hand-coloured albumen prints.

It is possible that Hong Cheong was related to Tong Cheong, the Chinese operator of another photographic studio in Yokohama known from an advertisement of 1884.

Notes

References
 Bennett, Terry. Old Japanese Photographs: Collector's Data Guide London: Quaritch, 2006.  (hard)
 Bennett, Terry. Photography in Japan: 1853–1912 Rutland, Vermont: Charles E. Tuttle, 2006.  (hard)

Chinese expatriates in Japan
Chinese photographers
Photography in Japan
Year of birth missing
Year of death unknown
Chinese expatriates in Hong Kong